QBE may refer to:

QBE Insurance, a multinational insurance company
Query by Example, devised by Moshé M. Zloof at IBM Research during the mid-1970s
Microsoft Query by Example, derived from Zloof's original